Alyabiev Glacier is a glacier in Antarctica, flowing south from Gluck Peak into Boccherini Inlet and lies about  West of Arensky Glacier on Beethoven Peninsula, Alexander Island, It was named by the USSR Academy of Sciences, in 1987, after Alexander Alyabiev (1787-1851), the Russian composer.

See also
 List of glaciers in the Antarctic
 Glaciology

References

 

Glaciers of Alexander Island